Politics of Japan are conducted in a framework of a dominant-party bicameral parliamentary constitutional monarchy, in which the Emperor is the head of state and the Prime Minister is the head of government and the head of the Cabinet, which directs the executive branch.

Legislative power is vested in the National Diet, which consists of the House of Representatives and the House of Councillors. The House of Representatives has eighteen standing committees ranging in size from 20 to 50 members and The House of Councillors has sixteen ranging from 10 to 45 members.

Judicial power is vested in the Supreme Court and lower courts, and sovereignty is vested in by the 1947 Constitution, which was written during the Occupation of Japan primarily by American officials and had replaced the previous Meiji Constitution. Japan is considered a constitutional monarchy with a system of civil law.

Politics in Japan in the post-war period has largely been dominated by the ruling Liberal Democratic Party (LDP), which has been in power almost continuously since its foundation in 1955, a phenomenon known as the 1955 System. Of the 31 prime ministers since the end of the country's occupation, 24 as well as the longest serving ones have been members of the LDP. Consequently, Japan has been described as a de facto one-party state.

Constitution

Legitimacy
The creation and ratification of this current document has been widely viewed by many geopolitical analysts and historians as one that was forced upon Japan by the United States after the end of World War II.

Although this "imposition" claim arose originally as a rallying cry among conservative politicians in favour of constitutional revision in the 1950s, and that it wasn't "inherently Japanese", it has also been supported by the research of several independent American and Japanese historians of the period.

A competing claim, which also emerged from the political maelstrom of the 1950s revision debate, holds that the ratification decision was actually the result of apparent "collaboration" between American occupation authorities, successive Japanese governments of the time, and private sector "actors".

Government

The Constitution of Japan defines the Emperor to be "the symbol of the State and of the unity of the people". He performs ceremonial duties and holds no real power. Political power is held mainly by the Prime Minister and other elected members of the Diet. The Imperial Throne is succeeded by a member of the Imperial House as designated by the Imperial Household Law.

The chief of the executive branch, the Prime Minister, is appointed by the Emperor as directed by the Diet. They are a member of either house of the Diet and must be a civilian. The Cabinet members are nominated by the Prime Minister, and are also required to be civilian. With the Liberal Democratic Party (LDP) in power, it has been convention that the President of the party serves as the Prime Minister.

Legislature

Japan's constitution states that the National Diet, its law-making institution, shall consist of two Houses, namely the House of Representatives (衆議院, しゅうぎいん, Shūgiin) and the House of Councillors (参議院, さんぎいん, Sangiin). The Diet shall be the highest organ of state power, and shall be the sole law-making organ of the State. It states that both Houses shall consist of elected members, representative of all the people and that the number of the members of each House shall be fixed by law. Both houses pass legislation in identical form for it to become law. Similarly to other parliamentary systems, most legislation that is considered in the Diet is proposed by the cabinet. The cabinet then relies on the expertise of the bureaucracy to draft actual bills.

The lower house, the House of Representatives, the most powerful of the two, holds power over the government, being able to force its resignation. The lower house also has ultimate control of the passage of the budget, the ratification of treaties, and the selection of the Prime Minister. Its power over its sister house is, if a bill is passed by the lower house (the House of Representatives) but is voted down by the upper house (the House of Councillors), the ability to override the decision of the House of Councillors. Members of the lower house, as a result of the Prime Minister's power to dissolve them, more frequently serve for less than four years in any given terms.

The upper house, the House of Councillors, is very weak and bills are sent to the House of Councillors only to be approved, not made. Members of the upper house are elected for six-year terms with half the members elected every three years.

It is possible for different parties to control the lower house and the upper house, a situation referred to as a "twisted Diet", something that has become more common since the JSP took control of the upper house in 1989.

Political parties and elections 

Several political parties exist in Japan. However, the politics of Japan have primarily been dominated by the LDP since 1955, with the DPJ playing an important role as opposition several times. The LDP was the ruling party for decades since 1955, despite the existence of multiple parties. Most of the prime ministers were elected from inner factions of the LDP.

House of Councillors

House of Representatives

Policy making
Despite an increasingly unpredictable domestic and international environment, policy making conforms to well established postwar patterns. The close collaboration of the ruling party, the elite bureaucracy and important interest groups often make it difficult to tell who exactly is responsible for specific policy decisions.

Policy development in Japan

After a largely informal process within elite circles in which ideas were discussed and developed, steps might be taken to institute more formal policy development. This process often took place in deliberation councils (shingikai). There were about 200 shingikai, each attached to a ministry; their members were both officials and prominent private individuals in business, education, and other fields. The shingikai played a large role in facilitating communication among those who ordinarily might not meet.

Given the tendency for real negotiations in Japan to be conducted privately (in the nemawashi, or root binding, process of consensus building), the shingikai often represented a fairly advanced stage in policy formulation in which relatively minor differences could be thrashed out and the resulting decisions couched in language acceptable to all. These bodies were legally established but had no authority to oblige governments to adopt their recommendations. The most important deliberation council during the 1980s was the Provisional Commission for Administrative Reform, established in March 1981 by Prime Minister Suzuki Zenko. The commission had nine members, assisted in their deliberations by six advisers, twenty-one "expert members," and around fifty "councillors" representing a wide range of groups. Its head, Keidanren president Doko Toshio, insisted that the government agree to take its recommendations seriously and commit itself to reforming the administrative structure and the tax system.

In 1982, the commission had arrived at several recommendations that by the end of the decade had been actualized. These implementations included tax reform, a policy to limit government growth, the establishment in 1984 of the Management and Coordination Agency to replace the Administrative Management Agency in the Office of the Prime Minister, and privatization of the state-owned railroad and telephone systems. In April 1990, another deliberation council, the Election Systems Research Council, submitted proposals that included the establishment of single-seat constituencies in place of the multiple-seat system.

Another significant policy-making institution in the early 1990s was the Liberal Democratic Party's Policy Research Council. It consisted of a number of committees, composed of LDP Diet members, with the committees corresponding to the different executive agencies. Committee members worked closely with their official counterparts, advancing the requests of their constituents, in one of the most effective means through which interest groups could state their case to the bureaucracy through the channel of the ruling party.

Post-war political developments in Japan 
Political parties had begun to revive almost immediately after the occupation began. Left-wing organizations, such as the Japan Socialist Party and the Japanese Communist Party, quickly reestablished themselves, as did various conservative parties. The old Rikken Seiyūkai and Rikken Minseitō came back as, the Liberal Party (Nihon Jiyūtō) and the Japan Progressive Party (Nihon Shimpotō) respectively. The first postwar elections were held in 1946 (women were given the franchise for the first time in 1946), and the Liberal Party's vice president, Yoshida Shigeru (1878–1967), became prime minister.

For the 1947 elections, anti-Yoshida forces left the Liberal Party and joined forces with the Progressive Party to establish the new Democratic Party (Minshutō). This divisiveness in conservative ranks gave a plurality to the Japan Socialist Party, which was allowed to form a cabinet, which lasted less than a year. Thereafter, the socialist party steadily declined in its electoral successes. After a short period of Democratic Party administration, Yoshida returned in late 1948 and continued to serve as prime minister until 1954.

Even before Japan regained full sovereignty, the government had rehabilitated nearly 80,000 people who had been purged, many of whom returned to their former political and government positions. A debate over limitations on military spending and the sovereignty of the Emperor ensued, contributing to the great reduction in the Liberal Party's majority in the first post-occupation elections (October 1952). After several reorganizations of the armed forces, in 1954 the Japan Self-Defense Forces were established under a civilian director. Cold War realities and the hot war in nearby Korea also contributed significantly to the United States-influenced economic redevelopment, the suppression of communism, and the discouragement of organized labor in Japan during this period.

Continual fragmentation of parties and a succession of minority governments led conservative forces to merge the Liberal Party (Jiyūtō) with the Japan Democratic Party (Nihon Minshutō), an offshoot of the earlier Democratic Party, to form the Liberal Democratic Party (Jiyū-Minshutō; LDP) in November 1955, called 1955 System. This party continuously held power from 1955 through 1993, except for a short while when it was replaced by a new minority government. LDP leadership was drawn from the elite who had seen Japan through the defeat and occupation. It attracted former bureaucrats, local politicians, businessmen, journalists, other professionals, farmers, and university graduates.

In October 1955, socialist groups reunited under the Japan Socialist Party, which emerged as the second most powerful political force. It was followed closely in popularity by the Kōmeitō, founded in 1964 as the political arm of the Soka Gakkai (Value Creation Society), until 1991, a lay organization affiliated with the Nichiren Shoshu Buddhist sect. The Komeito emphasized the traditional Japanese beliefs and attracted urban laborers, former rural residents, and women. Like the Japan Socialist Party, it favored the gradual modification and dissolution of the Japan-United States Mutual Security Assistance Pact.

Political developments since 1990 
The LDP domination lasted until the Diet Lower House elections on 18 July 1993, in which LDP failed to win a majority. A coalition of new parties and existing opposition parties formed a governing majority and elected a new prime minister, Morihiro Hosokawa, in August 1993. His government's major legislative objective was political reform, consisting of a package of new political financing restrictions and major changes in the electoral system. The coalition succeeded in passing landmark political reform legislation in January 1994.

In April 1994, Prime Minister Hosokawa resigned. Prime Minister Tsutomu Hata formed the successor coalition government, Japan's first minority government in almost 40 years. Prime Minister Hata resigned less than two months later. Prime Minister Tomiichi Murayama formed the next government in June 1994 with the coalition of Japan Socialist Party (JSP), the LDP, and the small New Party Sakigake. The advent of a coalition containing the JSP and LDP shocked many observers because of their previously fierce rivalry.

Prime Minister Murayama served from June 1994 to January 1996. He was succeeded by Prime Minister Ryutaro Hashimoto, who served from January 1996 to July 1998. Prime Minister Hashimoto headed a loose coalition of three parties until the July 1998 Upper House election, when the two smaller parties cut ties with the LDP. Hashimoto resigned due to a poor electoral performance by the LDP in the Upper House elections. He was succeeded as party president of the LDP and prime minister by Keizo Obuchi, who took office on 30 July 1998. The LDP formed a governing coalition with the Liberal Party in January 1999, and Keizo Obuchi remained prime minister. The LDP-Liberal coalition expanded to include the New Komeito Party in October 1999.

Political developments since 2000 
Prime Minister Obuchi suffered a stroke in April 2001 and was replaced by Yoshirō Mori. After the Liberal Party left the coalition in April 2000, Prime Minister Mori welcomed a Liberal Party splinter group, the New Conservative Party, into the ruling coalition. The three-party coalition made up of the LDP, New Komeito, and the New Conservative Party maintained its majority in the Diet following the June 2000 Lower House elections.

After a turbulent year in office in which he saw his approval ratings plummet to the single digits, Prime Minister Mori agreed to hold early elections for the LDP presidency in order to improve his party's chances in crucial July 2001 Upper House elections. On 24 April 2001, riding a wave of grassroots desire for change, maverick politician Junichiro Koizumi defeated former Prime Minister Hashimoto and other party stalwarts on a platform of economic and political reform.

Koizumi was elected as Japan's 56th Prime Minister on 26 April 2001. On 11 October 2003, Prime Minister Koizumi dissolved the lower house and he was re-elected as the president of the LDP. Likewise, that year, the LDP won the election, even though it suffered setbacks from the new opposition party, the liberal and social-democratic Democratic Party (DPJ). A similar event occurred during the 2004 Upper House elections as well.

In a strong move, on 8 August 2005, Prime Minister Junichiro Koizumi called for a snap election to the lower house, as threatened, after LDP stalwarts and opposition DPJ parliamentarians defeated his proposal for a large-scale reform and privatization of Japan Post, which besides being Japan's state-owned postal monopoly is arguably the world's largest financial institution, with nearly 331 trillion yen of assets. The election was scheduled for 11 September 2005, with the LDP achieving a landslide victory under Junichiro Koizumi's leadership.

The ruling LDP started losing hold in 2006. No prime minister except Koizumi had good public support. On 26 September 2006, new LDP President Shinzō Abe was elected by a special session of the Diet to succeed Junichiro Koizumi as Prime Minister. He was Japan's youngest post-World War II prime minister and the first born after the war. On 12 September 2007, Abe surprised Japan by announcing his resignation from office. He was replaced by Yasuo Fukuda, a veteran of LDP.

In the meantime, on 4 November 2007, leader of the main opposition party, Ichirō Ozawa announced his resignation from the post of party president, after controversy over an offer to the DPJ to join the ruling coalition in a grand coalition, but has since, with some embarrassment, rescinded his resignation.

On 11 January 2008, Prime Minister Yasuo Fukuda forced a bill allowing ships to continue a refueling mission in the Indian Ocean in support of US-led operations in Afghanistan.  To do so, PM Fukuda used the LDP's overwhelming majority in the Lower House to ignore a previous "no-vote" of the opposition-controlled Upper House. This was the first time in 50 years that the Lower House voted to ignore the opinion of the Upper House. Fukuda resigned suddenly on 1 September 2008, just a few weeks after reshuffling his cabinet. On 1 September 2008, Fukuda's resignation was designed so that the LDP did not suffer a "power vacuum". It thus caused a leadership election within the LDP, and the winner, Tarō Asō was chosen as the new party president and on 24 September 2008, he was appointed as 92nd Prime Minister after the House of Representatives voted in his favor in the extraordinary session of Diet.

Later, on 21 July 2009, Prime Minister Asō dissolved the House of Representatives and elections were held on 30 August.
The election results for the House of Representatives were announced on 30 and 31 August 2009. The opposition party DPJ led by Yukio Hatoyama, won a majority by gaining 308 seats (10 seats were won by its allies the Social Democratic Party and the People's New Party). On 16 September 2009, president of DPJ, Hatoyama was elected by the House of Representatives as the 93rd Prime Minister of Japan.

Political developments since 2010 
      On 2 June 2010, Hatoyama resigned due to lack of fulfillments of his policies, both domestically and internationally and soon after, on 8 June, Akihito, Emperor of Japan ceremonially swore in the newly elected DPJ's president, Naoto Kan as prime minister. Kan suffered an early setback in the 2010 Japanese House of Councillors election. In a routine political change in Japan, DPJ's new president and former finance minister of Naoto Kan's cabinet, Yoshihiko Noda was cleared and elected by the Diet as 95th prime minister on 30 August 2011. He was officially appointed as prime minister in the attestation ceremony at Imperial Palace on 2 September 2011.

Noda dissolved the lower house on 16 November 2012 (as he failed to get support outside the Diet on various domestic issues i.e. tax, nuclear energy) and elections were held on 16 December. The results were in favor of the LDP, which won an absolute majority in the leadership of former Prime Minister Shinzō Abe. He was appointed as the 96th Prime Minister of Japan on 26 December 2012. With the changing political situation, earlier in November 2014, Prime Minister Abe called for a fresh mandate for the Lower House. In an opinion poll the government failed to win public trust due to bad economic achievements in the two consecutive quarters and on the tax reforms.

The election was held on 14 December 2014, and the results were in favor of the LDP and its ally New Komeito. Together they managed to secure a huge majority by winning 325 seats for the Lower House. The opposition, DPJ, could not manage to provide alternatives to the voters with its policies and programs. "Abenomics", the ambitious self-titled fiscal policy of the current prime minister, managed to attract more voters in this election, many Japanese voters supported the policies. Shinzō Abe was sworn as the 97th prime minister on 24 December 2014 and would go ahead with his agenda of economic revitalization and structural reforms in Japan.

Prime Minister Abe was elected again for a fourth term after the 2017 election. It was a snap election called by Prime Minister Shinzo Abe. Abe's ruling coalition  won a clear majority with more than two-thirds of 465 seats in the lower house of Parliament (House of Representatives). The opposition was in deep political crisis.

In July 2019, Japan had a national election. The ruling Liberal Democratic Party (LDP) of Prime Minister Abe won a majority of seats in the upper house of Parliament (House of Councillors). However, Abe failed to achieve the two-thirds majority, and the ruling coalition could not amend the constitution.

Political developments since 2020 

On 28 August 2020 following reports of ill-health, Abe resigned citing health concerns, triggering a leadership election to replace him as Prime Minister. Abe was the longest-serving Prime Minister in Japan’s history.

After winning the leadership of the governing Liberal Democratic Party (LDP), Yoshihide Suga, close ally of his predecessor, was elected as the country's new prime minister by Japan's parliament in September 2020. Suga’s response to the novel coronavirus pandemic, as the architect of the GoTo tourism program criticised for helping the virus spread, along with high case numbers in April 2021 ahead of the Tokyo Olympics has since negatively affected perceptions of his administration. On 2 September 2021, Suga announced that he would not seek reelection as LDP President, effectively ending his term as Prime Minister. On 4 October 2021, Fumio Kishida took office as the country's new Prime Minister. Kishida was elected leader of the ruling Liberal Democratic Party (LDP) previous week. He was officially confirmed as the country's 100th prime minister following a parliamentary vote. On 31 October 2021, the ruling Liberal Democratic Party (LDP) held onto its single party majority in the general elections.

On 8 July 2022, Abe was shot and killed at a campaign rally in Nara for the 2022 Japanese House of Councillors election.

See also 
 Foreign relations of Japan
 Government of Japan
 Law of Japan
 Honebuto no hōshin
Political status of women in Japan

References

Further reading

External links
 Electronic journal of contemporary japanese studies
 JapanesePolitics